The 1984 Rhode Island gubernatorial election was held on November 6, 1984. Republican nominee and Cranston mayor Edward D. DiPrete defeated Democratic nominee Anthony J. Solomon with 60% of the vote.

Primary elections
Primary elections were held on September 11, 1984.

Democratic primary

Candidates
Anthony J. Solomon, Rhode Island State Treasurer
Joseph W. Walsh

Results

General election

Candidates
Edward D. DiPrete, Republican 
Anthony J. Solomon, Democratic

Results

References

1984
Rhode Island
Gubernatorial